The women's team tournament of the 2019 European Table Tennis Championships will be held from 3 September to 8 September 2019.

Preliminary round
The top team of each group advances.

Group A

Group B

Group C

Group D

Group E

Group F

Group G

Group H

Knockout stage

Quarterfinals

Semifinals

Finals

References

External links
Official website
ITTF website
ETTU website 

Women's team
Table